Yaroslav II, Christian name Theodor (8 February 1191 – 30 September 1246) was the Grand Prince of Vladimir (1238–1246) who helped to restore his country and capital after the Mongol invasion of Rus'.

Prince of Pereyaslav
Yaroslav was the fourth son of Vsevolod the Big Nest and Maria Shvarnovna.

In 1200, he was sent by his father to rule the town of Pereiaslav near the Kypchak steppes. Six years later, he was summoned by boyars of Halych to rule their city but could not effectively claim the throne. Thereupon he was sent to take Ryazan, but the stubborn opposition of the inhabitants led to the city being burnt. In 1209, Vsevolod sent Yaroslav to oppose Mstislav the Bold in Novgorod. After several battles, the two princes made peace, whereby Yaroslav married Mstislav's daughter.

Upon his deathbed, Vsevolod the Big Nest bequeathed to him Pereslavl-Zalessky. In the conflict between his elder brothers Konstantin and Yuri, Yaroslav supported the latter. In 1215, he accepted the offer of the Novgorodians to become their prince but, desiring revenge for their former treachery, captured Torzhok and blocked its supplies of grain to Novgorod. Several months later, he was defeated by his father-in-law on the Lipitsa River and had to retreat to Pereslavl; a helmet that he lost during the battle would be retrieved by archaeologists in 1808.

Prince of Novgorod and Kiev
In 1222, Yaroslav, finally enthroned in Novgorod, overran all of Estonia and besieged its capital Kolyvan. Four years later, he devastated Finland and baptised Karelia. His next ambition was to subjugate Pskov, but the Novgorodians refused to make war against its neighbour. Yaroslav departed in anger and seized the Novgorodian enclave of Volokolamsk. In 1234, he returned to Novgorod and several years later defeated its chief enemies—Lithuanians and Teutonic Knights. In 1236, he followed Danylo of Halych's advice and moved from Novgorod to Kiev (Kyiv), leaving his son Alexander as his representative in the north.

Prince of Vladimir
In 1238, when the Mongols first invaded Kievan Rus and his elder brother Yuri was killed in battle, Yaroslav left Kiev for Vladimir, where he was crowned grand prince. Yaroslav attempted to restore the cities of Vladimir-Suzdal after the Mongol ravages and fires. In 1243, he was summoned by Batu Khan to his capital Sarai. After a lengthy conference, he returned to Vladimir with honours. Two years later, he was again summoned to the east, this time by Güyük Khan in Karakorum. There he was poisoned by the Great khan's mother Töregene and died a week after he had been allowed to return home.

Marriages and children
Yaroslav married his first wife c. 1205. She was a daughter of Yuri Konchakovich, Khan of the Cumans. Her people belonged to the Kipchaks, a confederation of pastoralists and warriors of Turkic origin.

In 1214, Yaroslav married his second wife Rostislava Mstislavna. She was a daughter of Mstislav the Bold and another Cuman princess. Her maternal grandfather was Kotian Khan. They were divorced in 1216.

In 1218, Yaroslav married his third wife Fedosia Igorevna of Ryazan. She was a daughter of Igor Glebovich and Agrafena of Kiev. Her father was the second son of Gleb Rostislavich, Prince of Ryazan (d. 1178) and Euphrosyne of Pereyaslavl. Her mother was a daughter of Rostislav I of Kiev. They had at least twelve children:

Fyodor Yaroslavich (Winter, 1219 – 5 June 1233). Betrothed to Euphrosyne Mikhailovna of Chernigov. She was a daughter of Michael of Chernigov and Maria Romanovna of Galicia and Volynia. Fyodor died the day before his marriage date.
Alexander Nevsky (30 May 1220 – 14 November 1263).
Andrei II of Vladimir (c. 1222–1264).
Mikhail Khorobrit, Prince of Moscow. Took control of Vladimir and proclaimed himself its Prince in 1248. Killed while facing a Lithuanian invasion.
Daniil Yaroslavich (d. 1256).
Yaroslav of Tver (d. 9 September 1271).
Konstantin Yaroslavich, Prince of Galich and Dmitrov.
Maria Yaroslavna (born 1240).
Vasily of Kostroma (1241–1276).
Afanasy Yaroslavich.
Eudoxia Yaroslavna.
Iuliana Yaroslavna.

Further reading
 Bibliography of the history of the Early Slavs and Rus'
 Bibliography of Russian history (1223–1613)
 List of Slavic studies journals

External links

Helmet of Prince Yaroslav

1191 births
1246 deaths
13th-century murdered monarchs
Grand Princes of Vladimir
Murdered Russian monarchs
Rurik dynasty
13th-century princes in Kievan Rus'
Roman Catholic monarchs
Russian explorers
Deaths by poisoning